Commodore (retired) Adrian Nance OBE is a former Royal Navy officer, a founder of several startup companies, and the founder of an international charity called "Wings Like Eagles" which provides disaster relief in Africa.

Nance was educated at Eltham College. He graduated from Birmingham University with a BSc in chemical engineering in 1976.

Nance served for 33 years in the Royal Navy.  Since his retirement in 2006 has devoted himself to disaster relief activities in southern Africa and to other high value work. In 2007 he founded the Wings Like Eagles charity, whose purpose is to send helicopters faster to disasters in southern Africa. Wings Like Eagles helped provide 46 hours of helicopter relief along with Mercy Air for the 1.8 million people affected by cyclone IDAI in Mozambique in 2019, and also coordinated the disaster response air group with the UN, which peaked at 23 aircraft. The helicopter company he founded owns one Bell Jet Ranger helicopter, which is based in South Africa and is available for commercial hire, and stands available for disaster relief when possible.  

Since his retirement, Nance has also been a consultant specializing in transformational leadership and growth. He served for 6 years as the financial trustee of the Humanitarian Logistics Association, assisting in its transformation from zero income, overseeing a major project with the EU, and helping set its strategic direction until 2018.  His service for 8 years as the Deputy President of the Royal Naval Association included overseeing a strategic review, a relocation, and the redevelopment of the trustees board, and resulted in him being appointed a Life Vice President on his leaving in 2013.  In other charity work, he was a trustee and later the naval vice president of the Officers' Christian Union for 5 years until 2007, who with others in 2005 helped its transformation into the Armed Forces Christian Union of today.  He is currently (2019) the Treasurer of Eastleigh Parish, overseeing 7% growth in 7 months, and engaged in its fiscal transformation and its transition to a stand-alone charity.  He is also currently a founder trustee of the Chandler's Ford Chaplaincy.  He is a public speaker for the charities he supports.  He is a member of the Institute of Directors. 

Nance started his long association with naval operations and military aviation in 1977. Most recently from a naval perspective, he was commodore of the Royal Navy Maritime Warfare School based in HMS Collingwood from 2004 to 2006, training commanding officers and 20,000 other naval personnel per year. This included him having the pleasure of accommodating the heads of the navies of the world who came to celebrate the 200th anniversary of the Battle of Trafalgar. His experience in government finance, international policy (in the embassy in Washington, D.C.) and in operations in the UK's Ministry of Defence has proved immensely valuable working with governments, the UN and NGOs in the disaster relief work he now does.  

Earlier, Nance was appointed an Officer of the Order of the British Empire, Military Division, in June 1991, for his service as commander aboard the destroyer  in the first Gulf War. During the 1991 Gulf War, HMS Cardiff's Lynx helicopter claimed two Iraqi TNC-45 fast attack craft, two ZHUK fast patrol craft and one Landing Craft resupplying Iraqi forces in Saudi Arabia. He was one of the youngest commanding officers in the Royal Navy when he was promoted to command of the destroyer  in 1990. He was twice the senior anti-air warfare officer for all British naval forces in the Gulf Tanker war, and was awarded the General Service Medal (Gulf clasp). As a result of that high intensity front line experience, Nance became a senior trainer on the elite staff of the Flag Officer Sea Training, and for 18 months he was the trainer of UK frigate, destroyer and aircraft carrier commanding officers, with other commanders from Holland, Germany, Portugal, Belgium and Italy. This early experience in high-level, international, cross cultural working in high output delivery is hugely helpful in the disaster response aviation and consultancy work Nance now does. HMS Sheffield was part of the task force sent to the Falkland Islands during the Falklands War. She was struck by an Exocet air-launched anti-ship missile from a Super Etendard aircraft belonging to the Argentine Navy on 4 May 1982 and foundered on 10 May 1982. Nance was awarded the South Atlantic Medal in 1982.

References

Living people
Alumni of the University of Birmingham
Royal Navy officers
HMS Cardiff (D108)
People educated at Eltham College
Officers of the Order of the British Empire
Year of birth missing (living people)